Klass is a compilation by British 2 Tone and ska band Bad Manners, released in 1983.

Track listing
 "Fatty Fatty"
 "Ne-Ne Na-Na Na-Na Nu-Nu"
 "Just a Feeling"
 "Doris"
 "Special Brew"
 "Echo Gone Wrong"
 "Lip Up Fatty"
 "Ivor the Engine"
 "Wooly Bully"
 "Lorraine"
 "Monster Mash"
 "Echo 4+2"

References

1983 compilation albums
Bad Manners albums
MCA Records compilation albums